Juan Crow is a neologism that was coined by journalist Roberto Lovato. It first gained popularity when he used it in an article for the Nation magazine in 2008. The term criticizes contemporary immigration enforcement laws by comparing them to Jim Crow laws, and has since become popular among immigration activists.

Laws
The term Juan Crow has been used to describe immigration statutes in the United States.

Laws in Arizona, Alabama, Georgia, and Texas have been considered Juan Crow laws.

California's Proposition 187 was considered a Juan Crow law by immigration activists. It required citizenship screening of residents and denied social services like health care and public education to undocumented immigrants.

As an era
The Juan Crow era refers to "the matrix of laws, social customs, economic institutions and symbolic systems enabling the physical and psychic isolation needed to control and exploit undocumented immigrants."

The Juan Crow traces back to the historical period of the Mexican-American war when the United States annexed Mexican territory. As the treaty of Guadalupe Hidalgo implemented peace between the United States and Mexico, the era of Juan Crow arose with the brutalization of Mexicans through lynching and torching. Authorities lynched Mexicans for the following reasons: speaking Spanish too loudly, job competition between settlers and Mexicans, resource hoarding, and maintaining order. As this leans toward an Anti-Mexican sentiment, these events transformed the era of Juan Crow into the current U.S. events with anti-immigration laws.

See also
Alabama HB 56
Arizona SB 1070
California Proposition 187
Georgia Security and Immigration Compliance Act

References

2006 neologisms
Anti-immigration politics in the United States
Anti-Mexican sentiment
Discrimination in the United States
Jim Crow
Legal history of the United States
Mexican-American history
Political terminology of the United States
Politics and race in the United States
Race legislation in the United States